Rafael Muñiz García de la Noceda, better known as Rafo Muñiz (born  1956) is a Puerto Rican actor, comedian, director, and producer of television shows and concerts.

The son of pioneering comic actor and producer Tommy Muñiz, Rafo's acting career began in the role of "Miguel" in "Gloria y Miguel", which aired on  WAPA in Puerto Rico. After graduating high school, he starred alongside his father as his father's son in law in the sitcom Los García (The Garcias), also on WAPA, during the late 1970s.

From there on, Rafo had on and off work as an actor, but by 1985, he had become a game show host at WAPA-TV. By that era also, he established a company named Promotores Latinos, where he performs as company President and main show producer. Promotores Latinos is now known as ProLat Entertainment.

Since  the 1980s, Muñiz has been one of the top music promoters/managers in Puerto Rico, and his firm, ProLat Entertainment, has represented artists such as Jennifer Lopez, Rubén Blades, Olga Tañón, Gilberto Santa Rosa, and others in their concerts in Puerto Rico, Venezuela and Panama.  Tanon split from his company in 2002, and Muñiz sued her for breach of contract. He quickly signed another Merengue singer, Melina León and TV personality, Silverio Pérez, to be represented by him. He also represented the late Luis Raúl, a Puerto Rican stand up comedian, and singer Jailene Cintrón. Some of his projects in the mainland U.S. include "ViVa Puente" a star-studded tribute to the late Puerto Rican superstar Tito Puente in New York, L.A., Miami and Dallas. He has produced concerts at Carnegie Hall, Lincoln Center, the Jackie Gleason Theater, and Madison Square Garden, among other venues. Currently, he is the manager of salsa music singer Gilberto Santa Rosa and comedian Miguel Morales.

See also
List of Puerto Ricans

References 

1956 births
Living people
Puerto Rican comedians
Puerto Rican male actors
Puerto Rican television producers